The men's 1500 metres at the 2013 World Championships in Athletics was held at the Luzhniki Stadium on 14–18 August.

For those competitors lucky enough to get into semifinal 1, they were treated to a rather pedestrian tactical race controlled by defending champion, Olympic champion and world leader Asbel Kiprop.  If you can't kick with him, you go home.  Semifinal 2 was a different story with a much faster pace all the time qualifiers came from this race, with several also rans left out with times faster than Kiprop.

With three Kenyans qualified, rumors were out that there would be a fast pace for the final.  That wasn't the case, first Kiprop looked around for his teammates and they weren't there.  On the second lap Nixon Chepseba took off into the lead, but all eyes were on Kiprop and nobody followed.  Matthew Centrowitz took up the position directly behind Kiprop on the rail, Mekonnen Gebremedhin on his shoulder.  For the next two laps Chipseba ran on his own, opening up as much as a 10-meter lead.  But when the running got serious everybody jockeyed for position behind Kiprop, Chipseba acting more like a blockade.  Kiprop didn't really unleash his kick until 90 meters from the finish.  Centrowitz moved right with him following Kiprop to the line for silver, with Johan Cronje squeezing past Chipseba on the inside to take bronze.

Records
Prior to the competition, the records were as follows:

Qualification standards

Schedule

Results

Heats
Qualification: First 6 in each heat (Q) and the next 6 fastest (q) advanced to the semifinals.

Semifinals
Qualification: First 5 in each heat (Q) and the next 2 fastest (q) advanced to the final.

Final
The final was started at 17:25.

References

External links
1500 metres results at IAAF website

1500
1500 metres at the World Athletics Championships